Thomas McEvilley (July 13, 1939 – March 2, 2013) was an American art critic, poet, novelist, and scholar. He was a Distinguished Lecturer in Art History at Rice University and founder and former chair of the Department of Art Criticism and Writing at the School of Visual Arts in New York City.

Biography
McEvilley was born in Cincinnati. He studied Greek, Latin, Sanskrit, and classical philosophy in the classics programs of the University of Cincinnati where he received a B.A., and the University of Washington, where he received an M.A. He then returned to Cincinnati, where he received a Ph.D. in classical philology. He also retained a strong interest in modern art, reinforced by the artists of his acquaintance.

In 1969, McEvilley joined the faculty of Rice University, where he spent the better part of his teaching career. He was a visiting professor at Yale University and the School of the Art Institute of Chicago, among others. He taught numerous courses in Greek and Indian culture, history of religion and philosophy. In 2008 he retired from teaching after 41 years, residing in New York City and in upstate New York in the Catskills.

He received numerous awards, including the Semple Prize at the University of Cincinnati, a National Endowment for the Arts Critics grant, a Fulbright fellowship in 1993, an NEA critic’s grant, and the Frank Jewett Mather Award (1993) for Distinction in Art Criticism from the College Art Association.

McEvilley was a contributing editor of Artforum and editor in chief of Contemporanea.

McEvilley died on March 2, 2013, of complications from cancer at Memorial Sloan-Kettering Cancer Center. He was 73. He is survived by his wife, the artist Joyce Burstein; two sons from a former marriage, Thomas and Monte; a sister, Ellen M. Griffin; and two grandchildren. His son Alexander predeceased him. He was married twice earlier; both marriages ended in divorce.

Work
McEvilley was an expert in the fields of Greek and Indian culture, history of religion and philosophy, and art. He published several books and hundreds of scholarly monographs, articles, catalog essays, and reviews on early Greek and Indian poetry, philosophy, and religion as well as on contemporary art and culture.

Art and Otherness
In his 1992 book Art and Otherness: Crisis in Cultural Identity, McEvilley collected and revised twelve essays from the 1980s in the midst of the Culture Wars, the roiling debate regarding the predominance of white, male, Western culture in academia and visual art, and the need for that supremacy to be challenged and opened up to other points of view. McEvilley did this in pointed fashion in "Doctor, Lawyer, Indian Chief," his influential jeremiad against the underlying assumptions that framed the Museum of Modern Art's 1984 exhibition Primitivism and Twentieth Century Art.

Toward a Redefinition of Painting for the Post-Modern Era
In his 1993 book The Exile’s Return: Toward a Redefinition of Painting for the Post-Modern Era, McEvilley made an important contribution to the late twentieth century "death of painting" debate. He noted that after two decades of decline in importance as a medium, painting revived around 1980. In its return from exile, painting assumed a new theoretical basis in postmodern cultural theory, together with a new kind of self-awareness and interest in its own limitations.

Heads It's Form, Tails It's Not Content
In the article "Heads it's Form, Tails it's not Content" McEvilley describes a theoretical framework for the formalist project presented by postwar critics such as Clement Greenberg, Michael Fried. He argued that formalist ideas are rooted in Neoplatonism and as such deal with the problem of content by claiming that content is embedded within form. Formalism is based on a linguistic model that Claude Lévi-Strauss argued is given content through the unconscious. In adopting a formalist approach, a critic cannot ignore the content that accompanies every deployment of form.

Sculpture in the Age of Doubt
In the book Sculpture in the Age of Doubt (1999), McEvilley analyzes the intellectual issues surrounding the postmodern movement in the course of 20th-century sculpture.

The Shape of Ancient Thought
In The Shape of Ancient Thought, McEvilley explores the foundations of Western civilization. He argues that today's Western world must be considered the product of both Greek and Indian thought, both Western philosophy and Eastern philosophies. He shows how trade, imperialism and currents of migration allowed cultural philosophies to intermingle freely throughout India, Egypt, Greece and the ancient Near East. This book spans thirty years of McEvilley's research, from 1970 to 2000.

See also

This section gives an overview of topics on which McEvilley has written.

 Art
 Art of the Indo-Greeks
 François Morellet
 Jean Pigozzi
 Marina Abramović
 Late Modernism
 Postmodern art
 Yves Klein
 Title This

Greek history and philosophy
 Indo-Greek Kingdom
 Legacy of the Indo-Greeks
 Plato of Bactria
 Pyrrhonism
 Similarities between Pyrrhonism and Buddhism

Indian philosophy
 Anekantavada
 Azilises
 Greco-Buddhism
 Paulisa Siddhanta
 Pranayama
 Rishabha (Jain tirthankar)
 Romaka Siddhanta
 Spalahores
 Spalirises
 Theodorus (meridarch)
 Zeionises

Selected publications

Books
 1964, Party Going (First Novel)
 1987, North of Yesterday (a Menippean Satire)
 1991, Art and Discontent
 1992, Art and Otherness
 1993, Fusion: West African Artists at the Venice Biennale
 1993, The Exile’s Return: Toward a Redefinition of Painting for the Post-Modern Era
 1994, Der Erste Akt
 1996,   Capacity: History, the World, and the Self in Contemporary Art and Criticism (with G. Roger Denson) 
 1999, Sculpture in the Age of Doubt
 2002, The Shape of Ancient Thought: Comparative Studies in Greek and Indian Philosophies
 2007, The Triumph of Anti-Art
 2008, Sappho
 2010, Art, Love, Friendship: Marina Abramović and Ulay, Together & Apart
 2010, Yves the Provocateur: Yves Klein and Twentieth-Century Art
 2013, Charles Dellschau's Aporetic Archive
 2014,   The Arimaspia  (Novel, a Menippean Satire)

Essays
 Heads It’s Form, Tails It’s Not Content; Artforum November 1982
 On the Manner of Addressing Clouds; Artforum Summer 1984
 The Monochrome Icon
 I Am” Is a Vain Thought
 Art History or Sacred History?
 Doctor, Lawyer, Indian Chief:‘Primitivism In Twentieth-Century Art at the Museum of Modern Art; Artforum November 1984.
 The Selfhood of the Other
 Another Alphabet: The Work of Marcel Broodthaers
 History, Quality, Globalism
 Penelope’s Night Work: Negative Thinking in Greek Philosophy
 Arrivederci, Venice: The Third World Biennials; Artforum November 1993
 The Tomb of the Zombie
 Paul McCarthy: Performance and Video Works: the Layering (2008)
 Here Comes Everybody 
Beyond the Pale, Art and Artists at the Edge of Consensus, Irish Museum of Modern Art, Dublin, 1994
Africus: Johannesburg Biennale, exhib. cat., Transnational Metropolitan Council, 1995
issue 4/5, 1995, of the magazine neue bildende kunst
Ekbatana exhib. cat., Images of the World, Nikolaj Exhibition Space. Copenhagen, 2000
 James Lee Byars and the Atmosphere of Question; Artforum Summer 1981
 Charles Dellschau: A Higher Vision Is A Basic Demand Of Poetry.

Monographs
Thomas McEvilley wrote monographs on Yves Klein (1982), Pat Steir, Leon Golub (1993), Jannis Kounellis (1986), James Croak (1999), Dennis Oppenheim, Anselm Kiefer, Dove Bradshaw (2004), Bert Long (2016).

Poetry
 44 Four Line Poems (1982)
 17 Ancient Poems (2013)

References

External links
  Authors Page, McPherson & Co.
 Jacket2 obit
 PennSound page
 Thomas McEvilley'The Shape of Ancient Thought' Video Michael Kasino
 
 
 
 Thomas McEvilley. "Art and Cognition.". Slought Foundation Online Content. 11 December 2004.

1939 births
American male poets
American art critics
2013 deaths
Rice University faculty
Frank Jewett Mather Award winners
University of Cincinnati alumni
University of Washington alumni
Writers from Cincinnati
20th-century American poets
Journalists from New York City
Journalists from Ohio
20th-century American male writers
20th-century American non-fiction writers
American male non-fiction writers
20th-century American novelists
American male novelists